This is a list of episodes for The Daily Show in 1997. It covers shows hosted by Craig Kilborn.

1997

January

February

March

April

May

June

July

August

September

October

November

December

References

 
1997 American television seasons